Liquid Amber may refer to:

 Liquid Amber (record label), launched by American music producer DJ Shadow
 The Liquid Amber EP, by DJ Shadow

See also 
 Liquidambar, the only genus in the flowering plant family Altingiaceae